National Highway 848B, commonly called NH 848B is a national highway in  India. It is a spur road of National Highway 48. NH-848B traverses the state of Gujarat and the union territory of Dadra and Nagar Haveli and Daman and Diu in India.

Route 
Gujarat
Karembali Phatak, Bamanpunja, Dholar Road,
Dadra and Nagar Haveli and Daman and Diu
Ambawadi, Patalia Coastal Highway,
Gujarat
Udvada

Junctions  
  Terminal near Karembali Phatak.
  Terminal near Udavada.

See also 
 List of National Highways in India
 List of National Highways in India by state

References

External links 

 NH 848B on OpenStreetMap

National Highways in Gujarat
National Highways in Dadra and Nagar Haveli and Daman and Diu